Dim Gaai (Cantonese 點解 Why) is the second studio album of cantopop singer Prudence Liew, released in November 1987.

Background information
Upon the success of her debut album, the eponymous Prudence Liew, her label, Current Records, followed-up with this album in the winter of 1987.  The album followed a different route of the debut album, where most of the songs were composed by local or Chinese songwriters.  This album featured many covers of European and American songs, including the title track.  Three of the cover songs were released as singles.  These covers were often treated with a strong dance beat reminiscent of her signature song from the previous album, "The Last Night".

Covers
Track 2: "Man in the Moon" is a cover of "Man in the Moon" by German singer Lady Lily (also known as Erika Bruhn from the 1970s German pop duo :de:Gitti und Erika) in 1986.
Track 3: "這雙眼只望你" is a cover of "Can't Take My Eyes Off You" by Frankie Valli in 1967.
Track 8: "失戀Cafe"  is a cover of "In The Night" by Spanish dance act Daydream
Track 9: "點解" is a cover of "What Have I Done to Deserve This? by Pet Shop Boys featuring Dusty Springfield in 1987.

Reception and reissues
Because Prudence Liew fared so well with critics, having won several Best Album of the Year awards, this follow-up album was often compared to it.  Critics often thought this album to be of lesser quality when compared to the debut album as this album is too "westernized" and contained too many covers. Although this album failed to achieve the critical acclaim of her previous album, it still sold fairly well in Hong Kong and was certified platinum by the Hong Kong IFPI in early 1988.

Due to the long-term success of the album, Sony BMG (and later Sony Music) have re-issued the album several times as part of their "The Legendary Collection" in 2005  and "Pure Gold Series" in 2009

Track listings

References

1987 albums
Bertelsmann Music Group albums
Prudence Liew albums
Sony Music Hong Kong albums